Pietrosanti is an Italian surname. Notable people with the surname include:

Francesco Pietrosanti (born 1963), Italian rugby union player and sports director
Katia Pietrosanti (born 1979), Italian rhythmic gymnast

Italian-language surnames